A brick is an artificial stone made by forming clay into hardened rectangular blocks.

Brick or BRICK may also refer to:

Places
 Brick Township, New Jersey
 Brick Lane, London, England
 Brick City, a nickname for Newark, New Jersey
 BRIC, an acronym for Brazil, Russia, India, and China, sometimes expanded to BRICK to include South Korea

Businesses
 The Brick, a Canadian furniture retailer
 Brick Brewing Company, a Canadian beer brewer
 The Brick Theater, Williamsburg, Brooklyn
 The Brick, a real bar in Roslyn, Washington, USA, featured in the 1990s television series Northern Exposure
 Brick Academy, a school in Bernards Township, Somerset County, New Jersey

Arts and entertainment

Film
 Brick (film), a 2005 American neo-noir thriller
 Brick (soundtrack), the soundtrack to the film

Music
 Brick (band), an American band formed in 1976
 Brick (Brick album), the band's 1977 album
 Brick (Talking Heads album), released in 2005, also known simply as Talking Heads
 The Brick: Bodega Chronicles 2007 debut album by American rapper Joell Ortiz
 "Brick" (song), 1997 song by Ben Folds Five
 Bricks (band), a late 1980s lo-fi alternative band fronted by Mac McCaughan, of Superchunk
 Bricks (Benny Tipene album)
 Bricks, a 1975 album by Hello People
 "Bricks", a song by Rise Against from The Sufferer & the Witness, 2006
 "Bricks", a deluxe edition track on the album The State vs. Radric Davis
 "Bricks", a 1988 song by Crimpshrine

Fictional characters
 Brick (comics), a DC Comics villain, enemy of Green Arrow
 Brick Bradford, the titular hero of a science fiction comic strip from 1933 to 1987
 Brick, in the Discworld novel Thud!
 Brick, a member of The Rowdyruff Boys, a group of characters in the animated series The Powerpuff Girls
 Brick the Berserker, from the video game Borderlands
 Dr. Brick Breeland, on the TV show Hart of Dixie, portrayed by Tim Matheson
 Brick Heck, on the TV show The Middle
 Brick McArthur, a character from Total Drama: Revenge of the Island
 Brick Pollitt, in the play Cat on a Hot Tin Roof and its film adaptations
 Brick Tamland, in the film Anchorman: The Legend of Ron Burgundy

Sports and games
 Brick (basketball), a slang term for a poor shot
 a poker term for a useless card
 Brick, a type of back-to-back triathlon workout involving two disciplines, most commonly cycling and running

People
 Brick (name), a list of people with the surname, given name or nickname

Other uses
 Brick (magazine), a literary magazine established in 1977
 Brick (electronics), a nonfunctioning electronic device
 Brick (keelboat), a French sailboat design
 Motorola DynaTAC, an early cellular phone commonly referred to as "the brick"
 The brick, a common name for the moth Agrochola circellaris
 BRICKS (software), a software framework for digital libraries
 Equivalent VIII, occasionally referred to as The Bricks, a sculpture by Carl Andre constructed in 1966
 Brick cheese, a surface-ripened cheese from Wisconsin

See also 

 El ladrillo (The Brick), a text on Chilean economy
 Bric (disambiguation)
 Brico (disambiguation)